The Durango mud turtle (Kinosternon durangoense) is a species of mud turtle in the Kinosternidae family.

It is endemic to north-eastern Mexico. It is found in the states of Chihuahua, Coahuila, and Durango.

References

 Iverson, 1979 : A taxonomic reappraisal of the yellow mud turtle, Kinosternon flavescens (Testudines: Kinosternidae). Copeia, vol. 1979, n. 2, p. 212–225.

Kinosternon
Endemic reptiles of Mexico
Natural history of Chihuahua (state)
Natural history of Coahuila
Natural history of Durango
Reptiles described in 1979